South Point is a shopping center in McDonough, Georgia. The mall opened in 2008 with JCPenney and Kohl's. Hobby Lobby and Hilton Garden Inn joined the tenant mix in 2009 and shortly after Academy Sports + Outdoors.

TJ Maxx, Toys "R" Us and Haverty's were all confirmed and opened as anchors in 2012. Other stores that opened over the past couple years include ULTA, Party City, and Five Below. Rooms to Go began construction in the 4th quarter of 2013 and have plans to open by the late summer of 2014. Freddy’s announced that they would be building a new restaurant in the center with a planned opening of May 2014.

References

Buildings and structures in Henry County, Georgia
Shopping malls in Georgia (U.S. state)
Shopping malls established in 2008
Shopping malls in the Atlanta metropolitan area
Lifestyle centers (retail)
Tourist attractions in Henry County, Georgia